During Major League Baseball's (MLB) 1998 season, Mark McGwire of the St. Louis Cardinals and Sammy Sosa of the Chicago Cubs pursued the league's long-standing and highly coveted single-season home run record (61), set in 1961 by Roger Maris. The season-long chase culminated on September 8, 1998, when McGwire, facing Sosa and the Cubs, hit his 62nd home run of the season to break the record. McGwire finished the season with 70 home runs, while Sosa finished with 66. The 1998 home run record chase, as well the previous's year pursuit of the record, was widely credited by sports analysts with restoring interest in MLB among its fan base following the 1994 strike that resulted in that season prematurely ending and the cancellation of the 1994 World Series. McGwire's record was later broken in 2001 by Barry Bonds, who hit 73 home runs.

Several players had come close to breaking Maris's record in the years before 1998. Before the 1994 season was cut short, Matt Williams of the San Francisco Giants and Ken Griffey Jr. of the Seattle Mariners were both on a pace which threatened Maris's record: they hit 43 and 40 home runs respectively in a season which was shortened by approximately 50 of the scheduled 162 games. In 1995, Albert Belle became the first player since Cecil Fielder in 1990 to hit 50 home runs in a season. Belle was only the 4th player in the previous three decades to reach the 50 home run milestone (George Foster hit 52 in 1977, following Willie Mays in 1965). In 1996, Brady Anderson of the Baltimore Orioles hit 50 home runs, twice the number he hit during any other season. Of more note was McGwire of the Oakland Athletics, who first drew attention by hitting a league-leading 52 home runs that season while only playing in 130 games.

The 1997 home run chase featured McGwire and Griffey, but neither reached it that year. It was during that season that full-fledged interest over the record kicked in as both players were on record pace well into the summer. McGwire finished the 1997 season with 58 home runs following his mid-season trade to the Cardinals, besting Griffey's total of 56 that year.

Breaking the record

Speculation on the potential of McGwire or Griffey breaking Roger Maris' home run record was a popular story heading into spring training, and was even promoted by MLB itself, in an effort to draw fans back to the game who felt disenfranchised by the 1994 strike that prematurely ended the season and led to the cancellation of the World Series. With the spotlight still on Griffey and McGwire (entering his first full season as a Cardinal), the latter opened the 1998 season by hitting home runs in each of his first four games. McGwire would ultimately find himself ahead of record pace for all but two games of the season; his pace hit a low of 58.9 on May 7 following a five-game drought. After hitting 16 home runs in May (only two short of Rudy York's ill-fated record of 18 home runs in August 1937), McGwire led the league with 27 home runs, ahead of Griffey's 19 and on pace for more than 80.

June, however, would be Sosa's month to catch up. His 13 home runs entering the month represented less than half of rival McGwire's total. Sosa had his first of four multi-home run games that month on June 1, and went on to break Rudy York's record with 20 home runs in the month of June, a record that still stands. By the end of his historic month, the outfielder's 33 home runs tied him with Griffey and left him only four behind McGwire's 37.

The three remained competitive entering August, a period which saw McGwire go on a season-high eight-game home run drought. After hitting a home run on August 8, McGwire's lead had dwindled to two, his 46 home runs just above Sosa's 44 and Griffey's 41. His relative lull in production continued, hitting only three home runs over the next ten days. His pace at the end of August 18, 61.9 would be his lowest for the rest of the season. On August 19, he returned to form, hitting two home runs and beginning the stretch that would see him hit 23 home runs in his final 39 games. Sosa, meanwhile, had followed up his 20 home runs in June with a combined total of only 22 for July and August. At the end of the month, however, the two sluggers were locked at 55 home runs, putting them on pace for about 65 in total and, for the first time in 37 years, leaving the single-season home run record in imminent jeopardy. They were also each one short of Hack Wilson's National League record. By this point, Griffey's total of 47 home runs left him well behind the pace of his two rivals, indicating that even in the event he could pass Maris's total, it would be unlikely that he would also be able to beat McGwire and Sosa. Griffey would finish the season with 56 home runs, matching his total from the previous season but still 5 home runs short of Maris' record.

McGwire began September with four home runs in his first two games against the Florida Marlins and took back the lead, 59–56. His September 5 home run set the stage for one of baseball's classic moments, as he sat on 60 home runs entering a two-game set against Sosa's Chicago Cubs. On September 7, McGwire hit a Mike Morgan pitch 430 feet to become the first player since 1961 to hit 61 home runs in a season. The next day, September 8, 1998, in a nationally-televised game against Sosa's Cubs and with members of the Maris family in attendance, he hit Steve Trachsel's pitch 341 feet - his shortest home run of the season - just over the left field wall, breaking the record for the most home runs ever hit in a single season. The ball did not even make it to the stands, and was caught by Tim Forneris, who worked as a member of the Busch Stadium grounds crew while attending law school at Saint Louis University. Forneris declined multiple million-dollar offers to sell the ball and instead gave it to McGwire.  In what was a show of both admiration as well as respect, Mark Grace, the Cubs first baseman shared a half-hug high five as McGwire rounded first, and after he touched home, Sosa charged in from right field and engaged McGwire in a celebratory embrace.

Afterwards, however, McGwire went six consecutive games without a home run, allowing Sosa to tie him again at 62 after hitting four home runs in three games against the Milwaukee Brewers. The two battled back and forth for the lead, and entering the final series of the season on September 25, were tied at 65 home runs. Sosa hit a 462-foot home run off Houston Astros pitcher José Lima for his 66th home run of the season. McGwire, however, would hit five home runs against five different pitchers during a Cardinals homestand against the Montreal Expos, and would set the single-season MLB home run record at 70 with a 370-foot home run off Carl Pavano.

Throughout the season, Sosa gave a "V" sign after every home run, dedicating it to the memory of Cubs broadcaster Harry Caray, who died that February.

Aftermath

The Cardinals, despite McGwire's efforts, finished the season 83–79, 3rd place in the Central and behind division rival Chicago who finished 90–73, earning them 2nd in the Central and a wild card berth. In winning the NL MVP award, Sosa finished with a .308 batting average, 66 home runs, and 158 RBI, besting McGwire, who finished with a .299 batting average, 70 home runs, and 147 RBI. The Cubs, however, were swept in the first round of the 1998 playoffs by the Atlanta Braves.

In 2001, only three years after McGwire and Sosa finally toppled Maris's record, the mark fell again, this time to San Francisco Giants left fielder Barry Bonds. Bonds broke the record on October 5 against Chan Ho Park of the Los Angeles Dodgers and, two days later, hit his 73rd home run of the season off the Dodgers pitcher Dennis Springer. Bonds' record continues to stand today.

The 1997 and 1998 home run record chases are widely credited by sports analysts as having restored interest in MLB among its fan base in the preceding years, as many had lost interest and felt betrayed by the strike in 1994, although others contest this.

The embrace, along with the constant praising of one another between McGwire and Sosa was spoofed in the fall of 1998 on Saturday Night Live by Will Ferrell (as McGwire) and Tracy Morgan (as Sosa) who try to one-up praising each other endlessly and then begin to slow-dance.

Steroid controversy
The Sosa-McGwire home run chase occurred during the steroid era. Bonds' record still stands, though the controversy over possible use of performance-enhancing drugs by McGwire and Sosa gained momentum when Bonds hit his 73 home runs despite having never hit as many as 50 in any other season. In the Congressional Hearing on Steroids, McGwire stated that any answer he gave regarding his alleged steroid use would not be believed by the public at-large anyway. Sosa seemed to not understand the questions.

Bonds has also been linked to steroids. He admitted to taking them, but he claims that he did not know what he was taking was steroids. Bonds and Sosa have been linked to illegal use of steroids in the Mitchell Report and other sources. McGwire has never been named by any official investigation; however, on January 11, 2010, McGwire admitted to Bob Costas of the MLB Network that he did take steroids throughout his career, including during the 1998 season where he broke the record.

Home run log
The following table outlines home runs that Mark McGwire and Sammy Sosa hit during 1998 season.

References

Bibliography

Home run record chase
History of Major League Baseball
Doping in baseball
St. Louis Cardinals
Chicago Cubs
1998 in sports in Missouri
1998 in sports in Illinois
Major League Baseball controversies